Elections were held in Illinois on Tuesday, November 4, 1958.

Primaries were held April 8, 1958.

Election information
1958 was a midterm election year in the United States.

Turnout
In the primary election, 1,594,388 ballots were cast (831,502 Democratic and 762,886 Republican).

In the general election, turnout was 67.72% with 3,427,278 ballots cast.

Federal elections

United States House 

All 25 Illinois seats in the United States House of Representatives were up for election in 1958.

Democrats flipped three Republican-held seats, leaving the Illinois House delegation to consist of 14 Democrats and 11 Republicans.

State elections

Treasurer 

Incumbent Treasurer, Republican Elmer J. Hoffman, did not seek reelection, instead running successfully for Illinois's 14th congressional district. Democrat Joseph D. Lohman was elected to succeed him, defeating former two-term Illinois Treasurer, Republican Warren Wright.

Democratic primary

Republican primary
Former treasurer Warren Wright won the Republican primary, defeating State Representative Louis E. Beckman Jr.

General election

Superintendent of Public Instruction 

Incumbent Superintendent of Public Instruction Vernon L. Nickell, a fourth-term Republican, did not seek reelection. Democrat George T. Wilkins was elected to succeed him.

Democratic primary

Republican primary

General election

State Senate
Seats in the Illinois Senate were up for election in 1958. Republicans retained control of the chamber.

State House of Representatives
Seats in the Illinois House of Representatives were up for election in 1958. Democrats flipped control of the chamber.

Trustees of University of Illinois

An election was held for three of nine seats for Trustees of University of Illinois.

The election saw the reelection of one-term member former member Harold Pogue and the election of new Democratic members Howard W. Clement, Richard A. Harewood.

The election saw third-term incumbent Republican Park Livingston, second term Republican incumbent Doris Simpson Holt and first-term incumbent Republican Cushman B. Bissell lose reelection.

Judicial elections

Lower courts
On June 8, 1958, the Superior Court of Cook County held three regular elections and two special elections. On September 2, 1958, a special election was held for a vacant seat on the 12th Judicial Circuit.

Ballot measures
Three ballot measures were put before voters in 1958. One was a legislatively referred state statutes and two were legislatively referred constitutional amendments.

In order to be approved, legislatively referred state statues required the support of a majority of those voting on the statute. In order to be placed on the ballot, proposed legislatively referred constitutional amendments needed to be approved by two-thirds of each house of the Illinois General Assembly. In order to be approved, they required approval of either two-thirds of those voting on the amendment itself or a majority of all ballots cast in the general elections.

County Officers Re-election Amendment
The County Officers Re-election Amendment, a legislatively referred constitutional amendment which would amend Article VI of the 1870 Constitution of Illinois, failed to meet either threshold for approval. The amendment would have permitted county sheriffs and treasurers to be elected to successive terms.

In order for constitutional amendments to be passed by voters, they required either two-thirds support among those specifically voting on the measure or 50% support among all ballots cast in the elections.

Illinois General Banking Law Amendment 
Illinois General Banking Law Amendment was approved by voters as a legislatively referred state statute. It made modified the state's banking law.

Judicial Amendment
The Judicial Amendment, a legislatively referred constitutional amendment which would amend Article VI of the 1870 Constitution of Illinois, failed to meet either threshold for approval. Changes the amendment would have made included giving broad powers to the Supreme Court of Illinois and creating an appellate court.

In order for constitutional amendments to be passed by voters, they required either two-thirds support among those specifically voting on the measure or 50% support among all ballots cast in the elections.

Local elections
Local elections were held.

References

 
Illinois